The Justice Building designed by Thomas W. Fuller in Ottawa is so-called because it was previously home to the Department of Justice (Canada). 

Originally called Block D, it was built from 1935 to 1938 for the Royal Canadian Mounted Police (RCMP). It was renovated in 1998–2001 and now houses some of the offices of Members of Parliament.

It is similar Gothic Revival architecture design to the Confederation Building located just east of it, which was also designed by Thomas W. Fuller.

In Ian Fleming's short story "For Your Eyes Only" James Bond visits the RCMP headquarters when it was located in this building, and the book contains a description of the structure.

External links
Explore the buildings near Parliament Hill - Public Services and Procurement Canada
Thomas W. Fuller, Chief Dominion Architect 1927-1936

Government buildings completed in 1938
Gothic Revival architecture in Ottawa
Royal Canadian Mounted Police headquarters
Parliament of Canada buildings
1938 establishments in Ontario